The 2007–08 New Zealand Figure Skating Championships was held at the Alpine Ice Sports Center in Christchurch from 10 through 14 September 2007. Skaters competed in the disciplines of men's singles, ladies' singles, and synchronized skating across many levels, including senior, junior, novice, adult, and the pre-novice disciplines of juvenile, pre-primary, primary, and intermediate.

Senior results

Men

Ladies

Synchronized

External links
 2007–08 New Zealand Figure Skating Championships results

2007 in figure skating
New Zealand Figure Skating Championships
Figure Skating
September 2007 sports events in New Zealand